Aureliano Fernández-Guerra y Orbe (16 June 1816 – 7 September 1894) was a Spanish historian, epigrapher and antiquarian, also remembered as a poet and playwright.

Biography
Fernández-Guerra became a member of the Real Academia Española from 1860 and served as its Archivist and Librarian from 1872.

References

1816 births
1894 deaths
Members of the Royal Spanish Academy
19th-century Spanish historians
Spanish male dramatists and playwrights
19th-century Spanish poets
Spanish male poets
19th-century Spanish dramatists and playwrights
19th-century male writers
19th-century Spanish archaeologists